Almici is an Italian surname. Notable people with the surname include:

 Camillo Almici (1714–1779), priest of the Congregation of the Oratory
 Giambattista Almici (1717–1793), Italian jurist
 Alberto Almici (born 1993), Italian footballer

Italian-language surnames